Dölsach is a municipality in the district of Lienz in the Austrian state of Tyrol.

Population

References

External links
 Official Website (German)
 History of Dölsach (German)

Cities and towns in Lienz District
Kreuzeck group
Schober Group